end=Start / Shuuten ~Kimi no Ude no Naka~ (終点〜君の腕の中〜 / End Point ~In Your Arms~) is the thirteenth single by Japanese pop/rock artist misono. The single charted at No. 19 on the Oricon charts and remained on the charts for three weeks.

The coupling track "Shuuten ~Kimi no Ude no Naka~" was used as the ending theme for the feature film The Harimaya Bridge, in which misono acted in the role of Saita Nakayama.

Information
end=START / Shuuten ~Kimi no Ude no Naka~ is the thirteenth single by Japanese singer-songwriter misono under the Avex label Avex Trax. The single charted in the top twenty of the Oricon Singles Charts at No. 19 and remained on the charts for three consecutive weeks.

"end=START" was written and composed by Diamond Head's composer and electric guitarist Susumu Nishikawa. misono had previously worked with Susumu for her debut song "VS," "Lovely Cat's Eye" and "Hot Time," among others. misono wrote the lyrical portion, however.

The coupling track, "Shuuten ~Kimi no Ude no Naka~," was composed by Miki Fujisue, who is well known for his musical arrangements for anime. He wrote and composed the theme songs for the anime adaptations of the mangas D.Gray-man, Hayate the Combat Butler and Yoshinaga-san Chi no Gargoyle. The piece was performed by Toru Watanabe, who had also worked with misono's older sister, Koda Kumi, for the songs "Birthday Eve," "Hot Stuff," "you" and "Butterfly." As with "end=START," misono wrote the lyrics.

"Shuuten ~Kimi no Ude no Naka~" was used as the ending theme for the feature film The Harimaya Bridge, in which misono acted in the role of Saita Nakayama.

Track listing

Charts

Oricon Sales chart

References

External links
 misono Official Site

2009 singles
Misono songs
Songs written by Misono
Avex Trax singles
Japanese film songs